The 2017–18 Louisville Cardinals men's basketball team represented the University of Louisville during the 2017–18 NCAA Division I men's basketball season. The team played its home games on Denny Crum Court at the KFC Yum! Center in downtown Louisville, Kentucky as members of the Atlantic Coast Conference. They were led by interim head coach David Padgett after former head coach Rick Pitino was fired due to an FBI investigation into the school. They finished the season 22–14 overall, and 9–9 in ACC conference play, finishing in a tie for 8th with Florida State, who they defeated in the second round of the ACC tournament before losing to Virginia in the quarterfinals. They received an invitation to the NIT, where they defeated Northern Kentucky in the first round and Middle Tennessee in the second round before being defeated in the quarterfinals by Mississippi State.

Following their NIT quarterfinal loss, Louisville announced that Padgett would not be retained as head coach. On March 27, 2018, Xavier head coach Chris Mack was hired by Louisville.

Previous season
The Cardinals finished the 2016–17 season with a record of 25–9, 12–6 in ACC play to finish in a three-way tie for second place. They lost to Duke in the quarterfinals of the ACC tournament. They received an at-large bid to the NCAA tournament as a No. 2 seed in the Midwest Region. They defeated #15 Jacksonville State in the First Round before being upset by #7 Michigan in the Second Round.

FBI investigation

On September 26, 2017, federal prosecutors in New York announced that the school was under investigation for an alleged "pay for play" scheme involving recruits at Louisville. The allegations state that an Adidas executive conspired to pay $100,000 to the family of a top-ranked national recruit to play at Louisville and to represent Adidas when he turned pro. The criminal complaint does not name Louisville specifically but appears to involve the recruitment of Brian Bowen, a late, surprise commit to the school. On September 27, head coach Rick Pitino and athletic director Tom Jurich were placed on administrative leave.

Assistant coach David Padgett was named interim head coach on September 29. On October 6, the school also placed associate head coach Kenny Johnson and assistant coach Jordan Fair on administrative leave. On October 11, Louisville announced that Trent Johnson, former head coach at LSU and Stanford, was hired as an assistant coach. On the same day, the school announced assistant coach Jordan Fair had been fired. On October 19, Louisville hired former Ohio State assistant Greg Paulus as an assistant.

On October 16, 2017, the school officially fired Rick Pitino as head coach.

Offseason

Departures

Incoming transfers

2017 recruiting class

Roster
On September 27, 2017, the school suspended Brian Bowen from the team due to the ongoing FBI investigation. On October 1, it was reported that Bowen had hired an attorney to seek reinstatement to the team.

Schedule and results

|-
!colspan=12 style=| Exhibition

|-
!colspan=12 style=| Non-conference regular season

|-
!colspan=9 style=|ACC regular season

|-
!colspan=9 style="|ACC Tournament

|-
!colspan=9 style="|NIT

Rankings

*AP does not release post-NCAA Tournament rankings

References

Louisville
Louisville Cardinals men's basketball seasons
Louisville Cardinals men's basketball, 2017-18
Louisville Cardinals men's basketball, 2017-18
Louisville